William "Bill" M. Adams (born 1955) is a British geographer. He is Professor of Conservation and Development in the Department of Geography at the University of Cambridge and the Claudio Segré Chair of Conservation and Development at the Graduate Institute of International and Development Studies in Geneva.

Personal life 
Adams studied geography and graduated with a B.A. from the University of Cambridge, followed by an M.Sc. in conservation, from the University College London. He obtained a Ph.D. at the University of Cambridge. He has been awarded an Honorary Doctorate from the University of Stockholm, and the Royal Geographical Society's Busk Medal.

Work 
Bill Adams is a member of the Political Ecology group. He explores the ideas behind conservation initiatives and resource management, and the implications of these ideas in practice.

His research fields are:

 Conservation of landscapes that have been heavily modified by human influences (Sahel, urban environment)
 the political ecology of nature conservation at the landscape level
 the institutional large-scale ecological restoration of ecosystems
 Ecosystem services and protection concepts

Publications

Books (selection) 
 Leader-Williams, Adams and Smith (2010): Trade-offs in Conservation. Wiley-Blackwell. 400pp. doi:10.1002/9781444324907.
 Adams (2009): Green Development: environment and sustainability in a developing world. 3rd edition, Routledge.
 Adams (Hrsg.) (2008): Conservation, Routledge.
 Adams (2003): Future Nature: a vision for conservation. Revised edition, Earthscan.
 Adams und Mulligan (Hrsg.) (2003): Decolonizing Nature: strategies for conservation a postcolonial era. Earthscan / James & James.

References

External links 

Academic staff of the Graduate Institute of International and Development Studies
Academics of the University of Cambridge
Alumni of the University of Cambridge
Alumni of University College London
British geographers
Political ecologists
1955 births
Living people